Ipoh white coffee (Chinese:白咖啡,Tamil:ஒயிட் காபி)is a popular coffee drink which originated in Ipoh, Perak, Malaysia, resulting in Ipoh being named one of the top three coffee towns by Lonely Planet. The coffee beans are roasted with palm oil margarine, and the resulting coffee is served with condensed milk.

Origins 
The term white coffee originates from the literal translation of its Chinese name, which was introduced in the 19th century by Chinese migrants who came to work in the local tin mines. The coffee beans themselves are not actually white; the colour comes from the milk stirred into the end product.

In Malaysia, the original white coffee started in the Ipoh and was a drink made from beans roasted in margarine and served with sweetened condensed milk. This style of coffee continues to be popular throughout the country. However, “White Coffee” in Malaysia often simply refers to how the drink is prepared and presented - with margarine.

Overseas visitors finding the margarine-roasted coffee beans unorthodox (due to their slight caramelized flavor) are often misled into believing that there is a type of coffee bean endemic to Malaysia called the "white coffee bean". The beans used are invariably imported beans roasted to a light color.

Local coffee manufacturers now mix instant coffee powder with non-dairy creamer or whitener and sugar, and market the 3-in-1 mixture as white coffee as well. The mixture is preferred by Malaysians at home or in the office as a convenient easy-to-prepare coffee drink. The advisability, however, of consuming instant coffee mixed with non-dairy creamer and sugar daily is slowly coming into question, with some manufacturers now taking the sugar out of the mixture, and marketing the 2-in-1 mixture as sugar-free white coffee.

Styles 

Traditionally, Malaysian style ‘black’ coffee roast (Kopi-O) is produced by roasting the beans with sugar, margarine and wheat.

‘White’ coffee, on the other hand, is produced with only margarine and without any sugar, resulting in a less dark roast. Ipoh White Coffee is also widely available in an instant version. It is sometimes consumed after dinner.

The generic term ‘Ipoh white coffee’ in Chinese is "白咖啡"(Jyutping: Ji4bou2 Baak6 Kaa1fei1). Baak6 "白" (pinyin: bái), commonly meaning white, has nothing to do with the colour in this instance, but is rather a reference to the way the coffee is roasted. In Chinese, Bái also means ‘without’ or ‘unadulterated’.

See also 

 Oldtown White coffee
 List of coffee drinks

References 

Malaysian drinks
Ipoh
Coffee drinks
Coffee in Malaysia